Vijay Krishna (born 7 February 1956 in Delhi, India) is an Indian American economist who is a Distinguished Professor of Economics and Job Market Placement Director of the Department of Economics at the Pennsylvania State University.

Biography 
Krishna was born on 7 February 1956 in Delhi, India. He obtained his BA in Mathematics and MA in economics from the Delhi University in 1976 and 1978, respectively, and his PhD from the Princeton University in 1983. Krishna taught as assistant professor at the Columbia University from 1982 to 1984 before moving to the Harvard University where he was Assistant Professor from 1984 to 1988 and Associate Professor from 1988 to 1993. He joined the Pennsylvania State University in 1993 as associate professor and has been Professor since 1996.

His research interest cover topics in industrial organisation, economic theory, auction theory, communications in games and vote theory.

Krishna is married and has two children.

Selected publications 
Journal articles
 Benoit, J. P. & V. Krishna (1985). "Finitely repeated games". Econometrica, 53 (4), pp. 905–922.
 Benoit, J. P. & V. Krishna (1987). "Dynamic duopoly: prices and quantities". The Review of Economic Studies, 54 (1), pp. 23–35.
 Benoit, J. P. & V. Krishna (1993). "Renegotiation in finitely repeated games". Econometrica, 61 (2), pp. 303–323.
 Krishna, V. & R. Serrano (1996). "Multilateral bargaining". The Review of Economic Studies, 63 (1), pp. 61–80. 
 Krishna, V. & J. Morgan (1997). "An analysis of the war of attrition and the all-pay auction". Journal of Economic Theory, 72 (2), pp. 343–362. 
 Krishna, V. & E. Maenner (2001). "Convex potentials with an application to mechanism design". Econometrica, 69 (4), pp. 1113–1119.
 Krishna, V. & J. Morgan (2001). "A model of expertise". The Quarterly Journal of Economics, 116 (2), pp. 747–775. 
 Benoit, J. P. & V. Krishna (2001). "Multiple-object auctions with budget constrained bidders". The Review of Economic Studies, 68 (1), pp. 155–179. 

Books
 Krishna, V. (2009). Auction Theory (2nd ed.). Academic Press/Elsevier. .

References

External links 
 Vijay Krishna, biography page at the Pennsylvania State University
 

Living people
1956 births
People from Delhi
20th-century  Indian economists
Indian expatriates in the United States
21st-century  Indian economists
Fellows of the Econometric Society
Delhi University alumni
Princeton University alumni